Wangjingxi is an interchange station between Lines 13 and 15 on the Beijing Subway. The station was the western terminus of Line 15 until it was extended west to Qinghua Donglu Xikou on December 28, 2014.

There are plans to have the future Line 17 stop here as well.

History 

Wangjing West was originally going to be the terminus for the Capital Airport Express, so when the station was built in 2003, it was designed with dual-island platforms. In late 2010, the unused tracks were filled when line 15 started serving the station.

Station layout 
The line 13 station has 2 at-grade side platforms. The line 15 station has an underground island platform.

Exits 
There are 4 exits, lettered A, B, C, and D. Exits A and B are accessible.

Gallery

References

External links

Railway stations in China opened in 2003
Beijing Subway stations in Chaoyang District